L'ultimo amante (literally The Last Lover) is a 1955 Italian melodrama film directed by Mario Mattoli and starring Amedeo Nazzari and May Britt. It was a remake of Mattoli's 1942 film Stasera niente di nuovo. This version aptly concludes with the score of the famous prelude of La Traviata, by Giuseppe Verdi.

Cast
 Amedeo Nazzari as Cesare Monti
 May Britt as Maria Spanisch
 Nino Besozzi as Dr. Moriesi
 Frank Latimore as Giorgio
 Elena Altieri as Director of the newspaper
 María Martín as Girl in the institute (as Mery Martin)
 Cesarina Gherardi as The landlady
 Ernesto Calindri as Newspaper manager
 Elli Parvo as Girl in the institute
 Guido Celano as Emergency doctor
 Aldo Pini as Nello, the accomplice
 Maria Zanoli as Supervisor
 Anna Carena as Housekeeper

External links

1955 films
1955 drama films
Italian drama films
1950s Italian-language films
Italian black-and-white films
Films directed by Mario Mattoli
Remakes of Italian films
Melodrama films
1950s Italian films